Shahrak-e Emam Khomeyni (also Romanized as Shahrak-e Emām Khomeynī) is a village in Howmeh Rural District, in the Central District of Bandar Lengeh County, Hormozgan Province, Iran. At the 2006 census, its population was 183, in 61 families.

References 

Populated places in Bandar Lengeh County